3rd National Assembly may refer to:

 3rd National Assembly of France
 3rd National Assembly of Pakistan
 3rd National Assembly of the Philippines
 3rd National Assembly of Serbia
 3rd National Assembly of South Korea
 3rd National Assembly at Troezen